The Fiat Phyllis is a prototype fuel cell-type hydrogen vehicle introduced in the International Motor Show Bologna (Italy) held til 14 December 2008. Car's engineers are the Ecole Polytechnic of Turin (Politecnico di Torino) and the Fiat Research Center (Centro Ricerche Fiat) who concocted (Piedmont Region supports this study).

Release
The car is planned to be released in 2010, the first clients being the employees of the Turin International Airport: a dozen vehicles will be delivered for a test in real conditions.

Specifications
 Weight: 
 Length: 
 Height: 
 Cargo capacity: 142 L (2+2 seats) or 584 L (2 seats)
 Engines: electric propulsion and batteries (150 kg)
 Acceleration: 6 seconds (0 to 50 km/h (0-31 mph))
 Max. speed: 130 km/h (81 mph)
 Full recharge time: 5 h

See also
 Hydrogen ship
 Hydrogen vehicle
 Hydrogen economy

External links
Fiat Phyllis electric and fuel cell

Phyllis
Hydrogen cars
Fuel cell vehicles